Jean Archelais (2 January 1897 – 18 December 1957) was a French racing cyclist. He rode in the 1922 Tour de France.

References

1897 births
1957 deaths
French male cyclists